Time Fades Away is a 1973 live album by Canadian-American musician Neil Young. Consisting of previously unreleased material, it was recorded with the Stray Gators on the support tour following 1972's highly successful album Harvest. Due to Young's dissatisfaction with the tour, it was omitted from his catalogue and not released on compact disc until 2017. The album is the first of the so-called "Ditch Trilogy" of albums that Young recorded following the major success of Harvest, whereupon the scope of his success and acclaim became so apparent that Young subsequently experienced alienation from his music and career.

Nevertheless, Time Fades Away received much critical praise and was widely pirated after lapsing out of print because of the ensuing demand from fans. It was initially reissued only on vinyl as part of the Official Release Series Discs 5-8 Vinyl Box Set for Record Store Day in 2014. The album finally saw an official CD release in August 2017 as part of the CD version of the boxset. It was also made available as a digital download for purchase through the PonoMusicWorld website (closed), the iTunes store and Qobuz. In 2021 it is available on streaming platforms such as Deezer and Apple Music, and on the Neil Young Archives website.

History
Though "Love in Mind" dates from a 1971 solo tour, all other songs on the album are from the Harvest tour in early 1973. The program featured an acoustic solo set followed by an electric set with the Stray Gators. Longtime collaborator and former Crazy Horse guitarist Danny Whitten had been set to join the Gators as a second guitarist before being sent home from rehearsals after it became evident that he was in no condition to embark on the rigorous tour. He succumbed to a fatal combination of Valium and alcohol on the night following his dismissal.

Unlike Young's previous ensembles, the Stray Gators consisted of notable Nashville and Los Angeles session musicians; keyboardist Jack Nitzsche was the only member of the group who had worked with Young prior to Harvest. During the rehearsals, drummer Kenny Buttrey demanded a salary of $100,000 (roughly $571,000 in 2017) to compensate for lost session work, leading Nitzsche (with support from Tim Drummond) to prevail upon the singer to extend this salary to the other band members. Although Young reluctantly acquiesced, Nitzsche would later reflect that "Neil got so pissed off ... I don't think things ever recovered after that."

In the wake of the relatively dulcet Harvest, audiences did not always react positively to the new songs, many of which were emblematic of the Gators' raucous and heavily electrified live sound. Struggling to cope with Whitten's death, Young lambasted band members' performances following concerts and scheduled soundchecks that were often cancelled on short notice. Such behavior frustrated Buttrey, who left the band and was immediately replaced by former Turtles/Jefferson Airplane percussionist Johnny Barbata. Having previously stepped in to replace Dallas Taylor on Crosby, Stills, Nash & Young's 1970 tour, Barbata ultimately performed on all of the Stray Gators selections on the album. At the instigation of Drummond, Young also developed a penchant for tequila, with the singer later remarking that "it does something else to me than alcohol usually does."

Other band members performed erratically: according to producer Elliot Mazer, Nitzsche would often spew obscenities into his switched-off vocal microphone, while pedal steel/dobro player Ben Keith was so inebriated at one soundcheck that he could not recall the key of "Don't Be Denied", a song slated for the album. Following the loss of a pickup on his signature Old Black (a heavily modified 1953 Gibson Les Paul Goldtop), Young switched to a Gibson Flying V; according to Young, the guitar "wouldn't stay in tune" and had other problems. Biographer Jimmy McDonough has characterized Young's performances on the instrument as "the worst guitar playing of his career."

Alcohol abuse and strained singing would lead the singer to develop a throat infection in the final days of the tour. In a partial reunion of CSN&Y, Young hired David Crosby and Graham Nash to augment the harmonies and play rhythm guitar. Despite their integration, the band's repertoire remained confined to Young originals. Moreover, clashes among the Stray Gators continued, with Nitzsche complaining that he couldn't hear himself playing because Crosby's 12-string electric guitar overpowered the sound mix. Following sixty-two concerts over three months, the tour ended at the Salt Palace in Salt Lake City, Utah on April 3, 1973.

Recording
Time Fades Away was recorded directly from the soundboard to 16-track and mixed simultaneously to LP cutting using the Quad-Eight Compumix.

"There were no 2-track masters ever made of this record. The master discs were cut directly from the 16-track masters through the Compumix system. A mix was recorded to a second 16-track machine--we had 2 that would run perfectly together--to feed the variable pitch system of the lathe--but was discarded when we were through. I was the mastering engineer who cut the masters". - Phil Brown

While no master tape was created in the traditional sense, stereo tapes were in fact created while cutting to enable future remastering.

Release
Time Fades Away was released on Reprise on October 15, 1973, catalogue number MS 2151. The album reached #22 on the Billboard Top LPs & Tape chart, and quickly achieved gold status, selling over 1 million copies in both the US and UK. It was issued on vinyl, cassette and 8-track.

The album's title track was briefly released as a picture disc single in November 1973, with the B-side of "Last Trip to Tulsa", a live version of the song recorded in Baton Rouge, Louisiana on the Time Fades Away tour and unavailable anywhere else at that time. It continued to remain unavailable for another 47 years until its release on the Neil Young Archives Volume II: 1972–1976 box set released in November 2020.

Legacy
Cameron Crowe pays homage to both the album itself and the Joel Bernstein album cover photograph in his movie Almost Famous.  In great detail, as the lights go down during Stillwater's first concert performance of the movie, the short scene recreates the cover, from the raised hand of the concert-goer, to the solitary rose at the edge of the stage.

Reception

Upon its release, Time Fades Away received positive reviews from Rolling Stone, The New York Times, and Robert Christgau of The Village Voice. In more recent years, it has been rated highly by AllMusic, Sputnikmusic, and Blurt Online.

Cash Box called the title track "infectious" stating that it is "a rocker with that laid back Neil Young quality that has made him the favorite of the masses."

R.E.M. has cited Time Fades Away as a source of inspiration for New Adventures in Hi-Fi.

On December 31, 2013, Widespread Panic played the following three songs from Time Fades Away: "Journey Through The Past", "Don't Be Denied", and "Time Fades Away" at a concert in Atlanta.

Young's appraisal
Neil Young commented on Time Fades Away in the original, unreleased liner notes for his 1977 triple-album compilation Decade:

In 1987, Young told an interviewer that Time Fades Away was "the worst record I ever made – but as a documentary of what was happening to me, it was a great record. I was onstage and I was playing all these songs that nobody had heard before, recording them, and I didn't have the right band. It was just an uncomfortable tour. I felt like a product, and I had this band of all-star musicians that couldn't even look at each other."

Young has rarely played songs from Time Fades Away live. "Don't Be Denied" was included in the 1974 CSN&Y tour. In July 2008, he performed the record's title track at a concert in Oberhausen, Germany. A 2014 documentary on Young was also named Don't Be Denied.

Reissues
Time Fades Away long remained the only officially released Neil Young album unavailable on compact disk. Young had often cited his unfavorable memories of the tour as the main reason that the record had not been reissued.

In the mid-1990s, plans were made to release the album on CD using the HDCD encoding; several test pressings were made, and a release date of November 7, 1995 was announced. However, the CD release was shelved for unknown reasons. In early 2007, Young's management reiterated that there were no plans to release the album on CD. Pristine vinyl copies are still available in used stores and on eBay, often with the fold-out liner notes still intact; some CDs from the 1995 test pressings exist, and copies of these CDs are circulated as bootlegs. Additionally, some fans have made CDs from the more readily available vinyl copies.

In 2014, Young released a limited edition box set of vinyl records that includes the original Time Fades Away along with On the Beach, Tonight's the Night, and Zuma.  From December 2014, Young's first 14 albums, including Time Fades Away, were released as high-resolution downloads via the Pono digital music service, HDTracks and Qobuz. The album finally saw an official CD release in August 2017 as part of the CD version of Official Release Series Discs 5-8 boxset.  The CD version was finally released for individual purchase on September 23, 2022.

Time Fades Away is also available on streaming platforms such as Deezer and Apple Music. It is also available for streaming and download in high resolution audio on the Neil Young Archives website.

Time Fades Away II and Tuscaloosa
In October 2009, Young told Guitar World that a disc titled Time Fades Away II would be included in the second volume of the Archives box set series, noting: "It's interesting because [Time Fades Away II] has a different drummer than what was on that album. Kenny Buttrey was in there for the first half, and Johnny Barbata came in for the second. It's a completely different thing, with completely different songs."

In January 2019, in an interview with Rolling Stone, Young mentioned the upcoming release of Tuscaloosa, a live album featuring the February 5th, 1973 show at Tuscaloosa, Alabama from the tour. The album was released on June 7, 2019. Young has since stated on his Archives website that Tuscaloosa is "as close as Time Fades Away II that we'll get".

Track listing

Side one

Side two

Personnel
 Neil Young — vocals; guitar ; piano ; harmonica ; bass† 
 David Crosby — guitar ; vocal 
 Graham Nash — organ, vocal 
The Stray Gators 
 Ben Keith — pedal steel, vocal ; slide guitar ; vocal 
 Jack Nitzsche — piano ; vocal 
 Tim Drummond — bass 
 Johnny Barbata — drums 

† Neil Young credited as "Joe Yankee"

Charts 

Singles

Certifications

References

External links
Neil Young's Time Fades Away – Analysis and Reviews
Time Fades Away (no label) – Analysis and review of Time Fades Away on Collectors Music Reviews

Neil Young live albums
1973 live albums
Reprise Records live albums
Albums produced by Neil Young
Albums produced by Elliot Mazer